Prodigal Daughter or The Prodigal Daughter may refer to:

Film and television
 "Prodigal Daughter" (Star Trek: Deep Space Nine), an episode of the TV series 
"Prodigal Daughter", the premiere episode of TV series A Place to Call Home (season 1)
"Prodigal Daughter", an episode of Easy (TV series)
"Prodigal Daughter", an episode of Tadhana  Philippine TV series 
 Prodigal Daughters a lost 1923 American silent drama film

Literature
 The Prodigal Daughter, a novel by Prue Leith
 The Prodigal Daughter: A Biography of Sherwood Bonner, a 1981 book by Hubert Horton McAlexander
 The Prodigal Daughter: Reclaiming an Unfinished Childhood, a 2008 memoir by Margaret Gibson
 The Prodigal Daughter, a 1982 novel by Jeffrey Archer

Music
 "Prodigal Daughter", a song by Jonatha Brooke on the 2007 album Careful What You Wish For
 "Prodigal Daughter (Cotton Eyed Joe)", a song by Michelle Shocked on the 1992 album Arkansas Traveler
"Prodigal Daughter", a song by Larry Stewart on the 1999 album Learning to Breathe
"Prodigal Daughter", a song by Eddi Reader on the 2001 album Simple Soul

Theatre
 Prodigal Daughter, a play by J. E. Franklin, 1975
 The Prodigal Daughter, a play by Augustus Harris and Henry Pettitt, 1892

See also

 The Prodigal Son (disambiguation)
 The Prodigal Woman, a film